The highest honor conferred upon a graduating student from Lake Forest Graduate School of Management (LFGSM) is to be named a Hotchkiss Scholar.  Hotchkiss Scholars are selected on the basis of outstanding academic achievement and demonstrated commitment to the spirit of excellence. Hotchkiss Scholar eligibility is limited to the top 5% of the graduating class, based on Grade Point Average (GPA) ranking.  The Hotchkiss Scholar award was established in 1984 in honor of Dr. Eugene Hotchkiss III, President Emeritus of Lake Forest College and former member of the LFGSM Board of Directors.

Hotchkiss Scholars are announced at graduation because the final ranking of the graduating class is not known until after final exams are graded and the final GPA for each graduating student is calculated. Prior to the beginning of the graduation ceremony, the new Hotchkiss Scholars are presented with the Hotchkiss Scholars medallion, which is worn during the ceremony. The new scholars are also announced from the podium during the ceremony.

Lake Forest Graduate School of Management hosts an annual recognition dinner to honor the Hotchkiss Scholars. This dinner is usually scheduled for October or November and typically held at the Lake Forest campus. All prior Hotchkiss Scholars are invited to attend. The guest of honor is Dr. Eugene Hotchkiss III, for whom the scholarship is named. This dinner features a cocktail reception, welcoming speech, buffet dinner, featured presentation or panel discussion, and introduction of the new class of Hotchkiss Scholars. The new scholars receive a certificate of recognition and a memento marking the occasion.

References

External links 
 LFGSM Hotchkiss Scholar E-Newsletter - February 2005
 LFGSM Hotchkiss Scholar E-Newsletter SPECIAL GRADUATION EDITION – 2005
 LFGSM Hotchkiss Scholar E-Newsletter - June 2006
 LFGSM Hotchkiss Scholar E-Newsletter - September 2006
 LFGSM Hotchkiss Scholar E-Newsletter - January 2007
 LFGSM Hotchkiss Scholar E-Newsletter - September 2007
 LFGSM Hotchkiss Scholar E-Newsletter February 2008
 LFGSM Hotchkiss Scholar E-Newsletter SPECIAL GRADUATION EDITION – July 2008
 LFGSM Hotchkiss Scholar E-Newsletter October 2008
 LFGSM Hotchkiss Scholar E-Newsletter February 2009
 LFGSM Hotchkiss Scholar E-Newsletter SPECIAL GRADUATION EDITION – August 2009

Academic awards
Student awards
Scholarships in the United States